Erik Jiménez (or Erick Jiménez, born 17 September 1981) is a Cuban hammer thrower.

He won the silver medal at the 2005 Central American and Caribbean Championships, and finished eighth at the 2005 Summer Universiade. He became Cuban champion in 2005.

His personal best throw is 75.38 metres, achieved in May 2005 in Havana.

Achievements

References

1981 births
Living people
Cuban male hammer throwers
Competitors at the 2005 Summer Universiade
21st-century Cuban people